The Italian Mathematical Union is a mathematical society based in Italy.

It was founded on December 7, 1922 by Luigi Bianchi, Vito Volterra, and most notably, Salvatore Pincherle, who became the Union's first President.

History

Salvatore Pincherle, professor at the University of Bologna, sent on 31 March 1922 a letter to all Italian mathematicians in which he planned the establishment of a national mathematical society. The creation was inspired by similar initiatives in other countries, such as the Société mathématique de France (1872), the Deutsche Mathematiker-Vereinigung (1891), the American Mathematical Society (1891) and, above all, the International Mathematical Union (1920).

The most important italian mathematicians of the time - among all Luigi Bianchi and Vito Volterra - encouraged Pincherle's initiative also by personally sending articles for the future Bulletin; overall, about 180 mathematicians replied to Pincherle's letter. On December 7 of the same year the first meeting was held.

In 1928 the Italian Mathematical Union hosted the International Congress of Mathematicians in Bologna.

Activities

The Union's journal is the Bollettino dell'Unione Matematica Italiana, which contains two sections: one for research papers, and one for expository articles.

The Italian Mathematical Union awards the following prizes:

 the Bartolozzi Prize
 the Caccioppoli Prize
 the Vinti Prize
 the Stampacchia Medal
 the

List of Presidents

 1923-1932: Salvatore Pincherle
 1932-1948: Luigi Berzolari
 1949-1952: Enrico Bompiani
 1952-1958: Giovanni Sansone
 1958-1964: 
 1965-1968: Giovanni Ricci
 1968-1971: Guido Stampacchia
 1971-1974: Guido Stampacchia
 1974-1977: 
 1977-1980: 
 1980-1983: 
 1983-1986: 
 1986-1989: 
 1989-1991: Alessandro Figà Talamanca
 1991-1994: Alessandro Figà Talamanca
 1994-1997: 
 1997-2000: 
 2000-2003: 
 2003-2006: 
 2006-2009: Franco Brezzi
 2009-2012: Franco Brezzi
 2012-2015: Ciro Ciliberto
 2015-2018: Ciro Ciliberto
 2018-2021: 
 2021-2024:

References

Giovanni Sansone, Le attività dell'Unione Matematica Italiana nel primo cinquantennio della sua fondazione, Bollettino UMI, Serie IV, Suppl. fasc. 2 pp 7–43 (1974)

External links
Italian Mathematical Union 

Mathematical societies
1922 establishments in Italy
Learned societies of Italy
Organizations established in 1922